Andulo is a town and municipality in Bié Province in Angola. It is bordered to the north by the municipality of Mussende, to the east by the municipalities of Luquembo and Nharea, to the south by the municipalities of Cunhinga, Mungo and Bailundo and west by the municipalities of Cela and Quibala.

History
Andulo was promoted to the category of town on July 3, 1971 and on this date an annual festival is held to celebrate the event.

2008 incident
In September 2008, Islamic extremists rioted in the city, attacking the property of Christians and murdering the young daughter of a deacon.

References 

Populated places in Bié Province
Municipalities of Angola
1971 establishments in the Portuguese Empire